Chahu (also Romanized as Chāhū; also known as Chahoo Isin) is a village in Tazian Rural District, in the Central District of Bandar Abbas County, Hormozgan Province, Iran. At the 2006 census, its population was 959, in 203 families.

References 

Populated places in Bandar Abbas County